Fazal ur Rahman or  variants may refer to the following people:

Politicians 
Fazal-ur-Rehman (politician) (born 1953), Pakistani Islamic fundamentalist politician
Fazlur Rehman Khalil (born 1963), Pakistani Islamist politician
Fazlur Rahman Malik (1919–1988), Pakistani Islamic scholar and political philosopher
Fazlur Rahman (politician) (1905–1966), Bengali politician and first Education Minister of Pakistan

Cricketers 
Fazal-ur-Rehman (cricketer, born 1935) 
Fazal-ur-Rehman (cricketer, born 1995)

Other people 
Fazal ur Rehman (born 1943), Pakistani judge
Fazalur Rehman (bureaucrat), Chief Minister of Sindh 2018
Fazlur Rahman Ansari (1914–1974), Pakistani Islamic scholar and philosopher
Fazlur Rahman Babu (born 1960), Bangladeshi actor and singer
Fazlur Rahman Faridi (1932–2011), Indian writer on Islam and contemporary Issues
Fazlur Rahman Khan (1929–1982), Bangladeshi-American structural engineer
Fazlur Rahman Khan (geologist) (1939–1971), Bangladeshi intellectual and geologist

Arabic masculine given names